= Manuel Neto da Costa =

Angolan politician

- Born: Angola
- Occupation: Politician

Manuel Neto da Costa is an Angolan politician. He is the current Minister of Economy and Planning of Angola, as well as a member of parliament. He is the member of MPLA.
